The 2014 Penrith Panthers season was the 48th in the club's history. Coached by Ivan Cleary and co-captained by Kevin Kingston and Peter Wallace, the team competed in the National Rugby League's 2014 Telstra Premiership. The Panthers competed in the pre-season's 2014 NRL Auckland Nines. They then completed the 26-round regular season 4th place (out of 16), reaching the finals for the first time since 2010. Penrith went on to come within one match of the grand final but were knocked out by the Canterbury-Bankstown Bulldogs.

Squad

Player transfers 
A † denotes that the transfer occurred during the 2014 season.

Fixtures 
The Panthers again use Penrith Stadium as their home ground in 2014, now known as Sportingbet Stadium for sponsorship reasons.

Preseason  
A 16-man squad was sent to Auckland and participated in the Auckland Nines competition. The Panthers played a trial match against the Newtown Jets on 23 February 2014.

Ladder

Representative honours

Domestic

International

References

External links
Panthers official site

Penrith Panthers seasons
Penrith Panthers season